Elizabeth II was Queen of Ghana from 1957 to 1960, when Ghana was an independent sovereign state and a constitutional monarchy. She was also queen of the United Kingdom and other sovereign states. Her constitutional roles in Ghana were delegated to the governor-general of Ghana.

History

Ghana was the first western African country to achieve independence from European colonization. British rule ended in 1957, when the Ghana Independence Act 1957 transformed the British Crown Colony of the Gold Coast into the independent sovereign state of Ghana, with Queen Elizabeth II as head of state on 6 March 1957. Princess Marina, Duchess of Kent represented the Queen at the independence celebrations. On 6 March, the Princess formally opened the first parliament of independent Ghana, on behalf of the Queen, by giving the Speech from the Throne.

Constitutional role 
Ghana was one of the realms of the Commonwealth of Nations that shared the same person as Sovereign and head of state.

Effective with the Ghana Independence Act 1957, no British government minister could advise the sovereign on any matters pertaining to Ghana, meaning that on all matters of the Ghana, the monarch was advised solely by Ghanaian ministers of the Crown. The Queen was represented in Ghana by the Governor-General of Ghana, who was appointed by the monarch on the advice of the Ghanaian government. Two governors-general held office: Charles Noble Arden-Clarke (1957), and William Francis Hare, 5th Earl of Listowel (1957–1960).

The Crown and Government

The Queen and the National Assembly of Ghana constituted the Parliament of Ghana. All executive powers of Ghana rested with the sovereign. All laws in Ghana were enacted only with the granting of royal assent, done by the Governor-General on behalf of the sovereign. Every Ghanaian Bill presented to the Governor-General, had the following words of enactment:

The Governor-General was also responsible for summoning, proroguing, and dissolving Parliament. All Ghanaian ministers of the Crown held office at the pleasure of the Governor-General.

The Crown and Honours
Within the Commonwealth realms, the monarch is the "fount of honour". Similarly, the monarch, as Sovereign of Ghana, conferred awards and honours in Ghana her name. Most of them were awarded on the advice of "Her Majesty's Ghana Ministers".

See also

Title
The Royal Style and Titles Act, 1957 of the Parliament of Ghana granted the monarch a separate Ghanaian title in her role as Queen of Ghana.

Queen Elizabeth II had the following styles in her role as the monarch of Ghana:
6 March 1957 – 27 July 1957: Elizabeth the Second, by the Grace of God, of the United Kingdom of Great Britain and Northern Ireland and of Her other Realms and Territories Queen, Head of the Commonwealth, Defender of the Faith
27 July 1957 – 1 July 1960: Elizabeth the Second, Queen of Ghana and of Her other Realms and Territories, Head of the Commonwealth

Oath of allegiance
The oath of allegiance in Ghana was:

Abolition
After the 1960 Ghanaian constitutional referendum, Ghana adopted a new constitution that replaced the monarch and governor-general with a president. Ghana became a republic within the Commonwealth. The Queen sent a message to Ghanaians which said: "From midnight I shall cease to be your Queen. ... I am proud that I am Head of a Commonwealth in which every nation may choose for itself the form of Government which best suits it; now that Ghana has chosen for itself a republican form of constitution, it will not affect the interest which I have always taken and shall continue to take in the welfare of its people".

Royal visits
The Queen said in her Christmas broadcast in 1958, that she and her husband would be visiting Ghana in late 1959. To celebrate the upcoming visit, the Ghanaian Government commissioned a new £2 coin with a new effigy of the Queen and the inscription "Queen of Ghana". However, the coin was never struck since the visit was postponed, as she had become pregnant in 1959.

In November 1959, Prince Philip paid a six-day visit to Ghana. During the visit, he inaugurated the Ghana Academy of Learning (now the Ghana Academy of Arts and Sciences), and was appointed its first president. He also met members of the Accra Market Women Traders' Association at the Governor-General's Lodge in Accra, who presented him with a gold tie-pin.

Queen Elizabeth II visited the Republic of Ghana from 9 to 20 November 1961 and from 7 to 9 November 1999.

During her 1961 tour, the Queen famously danced with Ghana's president Kwame Nkrumah at a farewell ball in Accra, which many scholars believe was a symbolic moment in the history of the Commonwealth. Despite bombings in the capital and fears that Ghana was getting too close to the Soviet Union, the Queen insisted on this tour to make sure that Ghana did not leave the Commonwealth. A dramatised version of this visit was portrayed in the episode "Dear Mrs Kennedy" in the second season of the Netflix series The Crown.

Gallery

See also
Ghanaian constitutional referendum, 1960
Ghana Empire

References

Ghanaian monarchy
Government of Ghana
Politics of Ghana
Ghana
Heads of state of Ghana
1957 establishments in Ghana
1960 disestablishments in Ghana
Ghana
Former monarchies of Africa
Political history of Ghana
Titles held only by one person